John Woo Yu-Sen SBS (born May 1, 1946) is a Hong Kong filmmaker, known as a highly-influential figure in the action film genre. He is a pioneer of heroic bloodshed films (a crime action film genre involving Chinese triads) and the gun fu genre in Hong Kong action cinema, before working in Hollywood films. He is known for his highly chaotic "bullet ballet" action sequences, stylized imagery, Mexican standoffs, frequent use of slow motion and allusions to wuxia, film noir and Western cinema.

Considered one of the major figures of Hong Kong cinema, Woo has directed several notable action films including A Better Tomorrow (1986), The Killer (1989), Hard Boiled (1992) and Red Cliff (2008/2009). His Hollywood films include Hard Target (1993), Broken Arrow (1996), Face/Off (1997) and Mission: Impossible 2 (2000). He also created the comic series Seven Brothers, published by Virgin Comics. He is the founder and chairman of the production company Lion Rock Productions.

Woo is a winner of the Hong Kong Film Awards for Best Picture, Best Director, and Best Editing, as well as a Golden Horse Award, an Asia Pacific Screen Award and a Saturn Award.

Early life
Woo was born as Wu Yu-seng (Ng Yu-sum in Cantonese) on September 22, 1946 in Guangzhou, China, amidst the chaotic Chinese Civil War. Due to school age restrictions, his mother changed his birth date to 22 September 1948, which is what remains on his passport. The Woo family, who were Protestant Christians, faced persecution during Mao Zedong's early anti-bourgeois purges after the communist revolution in China, and fled to Hong Kong when he was five.

Impoverished, the Woo family lived in the slums at Shek Kip Mei. His father was a teacher, though rendered unable to work by tuberculosis, and his mother was a manual laborer on construction sites. The family was rendered homeless by the Shek Kip Mei Fire of 1953. Charitable donations from disaster relief efforts enabled the family to relocate; however, violent crime had by then become commonplace in Hong Kong housing projects. At age three he was diagnosed with a serious medical condition. Following surgery on his spine, he was unable to walk correctly until eight years old, and as a result his right leg is shorter than his left leg.

His Christian upbringing shows influences in his films. As a young boy, Woo had wanted to be a Christian minister. He later found a passion for movies influenced by the French New Wave especially Jean-Pierre Melville. Woo has said he was shy and had difficulty speaking, but found making movies a way to explore his feelings and thinking and would "use movies as a language".

Woo found respite in Bob Dylan and in American Westerns. He has stated the final scene of Butch Cassidy and the Sundance Kid made a particular impression on him in his youth: the device of two comrades, each of whom fire pistols from each hand, is a recurrent spectacle later found in his own work.

Career

Hong Kong

In 1969, Woo was hired as a script supervisor at Cathay Studios. In 1971, he became an assistant director at Shaw Studios. The same year, he watched Bruce Lee's The Big Boss, which left a strong impression on him due to how different it was from earlier martial arts films. Lee's films inspired to direct his own action films. His directorial debut in 1974 was the feature film The Young Dragons (鐵漢柔情, Tiě hàn róu qíng). In the kung fu film genre, it was choreographed by Jackie Chan, and featured dynamic camera-work and elaborate action scenes. The film was picked up by Golden Harvest Studio where he went on to direct more martial arts films. He later had success as a comedy director with Money Crazy (發錢寒, Fā qián hàn) (1977), starring Hong Kong comedian Ricky Hui and Richard Ng.

By the mid-1980s, Woo was experiencing occupational burnout. Several of his films were commercial disappointments, and he felt a distinct lack of creative control. It was during this period of self-imposed exile that director/producer Tsui Hark provided the funding for Woo to film a longtime pet project, A Better Tomorrow (1986). The story of two brothers—one a law enforcement officer, the other a criminal—was a financial blockbuster. A Better Tomorrow became a defining achievement in Hong Kong action cinema for its combination of emotional drama, slow-motion gunplay, and gritty atmospherics. Its signature visual device of two-handed, two-gunned shootouts within confined quarters—often referred to as "gun fu"—was novel, and its diametrical inversion of the "good-guys-bad guys" formula in its characterization would influence later American films.

Woo would make several more Heroic Bloodshed films in the late 1980s and early 1990s, nearly all starring Chow Yun-Fat. These violent gangster thrillers typically focus on men bound by honor and loyalty, at odds with contemporary values of impermanence and expediency. The protagonists of these films, therefore, may be said to present a common lineage with the Chinese literary tradition of loyalty among generals depicted in classics such as "Romance of the Three Kingdoms" (三國演義).

Woo gained international recognition with the release of The Killer, which became the most successful Hong Kong film in America since Bruce Lee's Enter the Dragon (1973) and garnered Woo an American cult following. Bullet in the Head followed a year later, but failed to find an audience that accepted its political undertones, and failed to recoup its massive budget.

His last Hong Kong film before emigrating to the United States was Hard Boiled (1992), a police thriller that served as the antithesis of his previous glorification of gangsters. Most notable of its numerous action scenes is a 30-minute climax set within a hospital. One particular long take follows two characters for exactly 2 minutes and 42 seconds as they fight their way between hospital floors. On the Criterion DVD and laserdisc, this chapter is referenced as "2 minutes, 42 seconds." The film was considerably darker than most of Woo's previous films, depicting a police force nearly helpless to stop the influx of gangsters in the city, and the senseless slaughter of innocents. As a result, it did not match the success of his other films, but nonetheless garnered positive critical reception and became one of his most popular films in later years.

John Woo: Interviews includes a 36-page interview with Woo by editor Robert K. Elder, which documents the years 1968 to 1990. It includes Woo's early career in working on comedies, his work on kung fu films (during which time he gave Jackie Chan one of his first major film roles), and more recently, his gunpowder morality plays in Hong Kong.

United States

An émigré in 1993, the director experienced difficulty in cultural adjustment while contracted with Universal Studios to direct Jean-Claude Van Damme in Hard Target. Like other foreign national film directors confronted with the Hollywood environment, Woo was unaccustomed to pervasive management concerns over matters such as limitations on violence and completion schedules. When initial cuts failed to yield an "R" rated film, the studio assumed control of the project and edited footage to produce a cut "suitable for American audiences". A "rough cut" of the film, supposedly the original unrated version, is still circulated among his admirers.

A three-year hiatus saw Woo next direct John Travolta and Christian Slater in Broken Arrow. A frenetic chase-themed film, the director once again found himself hampered by studio management and editorial concerns. Despite a larger budget than his previous Hard Target, the final feature lacked the trademark Woo style. Public reception saw modest financial success.

Reluctant to pursue projects which would necessarily entail front-office controls, the director cautiously rejected the script for Face/Off several times until it was rewritten to suit him. (The futuristic setting was changed to a contemporary one.) Paramount Pictures also offered the director significantly more freedom to exercise his speciality: emotional characterisation and elaborate action. A complex story of adversaries—each of whom surgically alters their identity—law enforcement agent John Travolta and terrorist Nicolas Cage play a cat-and-mouse game, trapped in each other's outward appearance. Face/Off opened in 1997 to critical acclaim and strong attendance. Grosses in the United States exceeded $100 million. Face/Off was also nominated for an Academy Award in the category Sound Effects Editing (Mark Stoeckinger) at the 70th Academy Awards.

In 2003, Woo directed a television pilot entitled The Robinsons: Lost in Space for The WB Television Network, based on the 1960s television series Lost in Space. The pilot was not purchased, although bootleg copies have been made available by fans.

John Woo has made three additional films in Hollywood: Mission: Impossible 2, Windtalkers and Paycheck. Mission: Impossible 2 was the highest-grossing film in America in 2000 despite its receiving mixed reviews. Windtalkers and Paycheck fared poorly at the box office and were summarily dismissed by critics. Woo directed and produced the 2007 video game Stranglehold, which is a sequel to his 1992 film, Hard Boiled. The game features Woo as a multiplayer playable character. That same year he produced the anime movie, Appleseed: Ex Machina, the sequel to Shinji Aramaki's 2004 film Appleseed.

Return to Asian cinema
In 2008, Woo returned to Asian cinema with the completion of the two-part epic war film Red Cliff, based on a historical battle from Records of the Three Kingdoms. Produced on a grand scale, it is his first film in China since he emigrated from Hong Kong to the United States in 1993. Part 1 of the film was released throughout Asia in July 2008, to generally favourable reviews and strong attendance. Part 2 was released in China in January 2009.

John Woo was presented with a Golden Lion award for lifetime achievement at the Venice Film Festival in 2010.

He followed Red Cliff with another two-part film, The Crossing, in 2014 and 2015. Featuring an all-star cast, the four-hour epic tells the parallel stories of several characters who all ultimately find themselves passengers on the doomed Taiping steamer, which sank in 1949 en route from mainland China to Taiwan and has been described as "China's Titanic".

Following the box-office disappointment of The Crossing, Woo and producer Terence Chang disbanded Lion Rock Productions.

Future film projects
In May 2008, Woo announced in Cannes that his next movie would be 1949, an epic love story set between the end of World War II and Chinese Civil War to the founding of the People's Republic of China, the shooting of which would take place in China and Taiwan. Its production was due to begin by the end of 2008, with a theatrical release planned in December 2009. However, in early April 2009, the film was cancelled due to script right issues. Reports indicated that Woo might be working on another World War II film, this time about the American Volunteer Group, or the Flying Tigers. The movie was tentatively titled "Flying Tiger Heroes" and Woo is reported as saying it will feature "The most spectacular aerial battle scenes ever seen in Chinese cinema." It was not clear whether Woo would not be directing the earlier war film, or whether it was put on the back burner. Woo has stated that Flying Tiger Heroes would be an "extremely important production" and will "emphasise US-Chinese friendship and the contributions of the Flying Tigers and the Yunnan people during the war of resistance." Woo has announced he will be using IMAX cameras to film the Flying Tigers project. "It has always been a dream of mine to explore shooting with IMAX cameras and to work in the IMAX format, and the strong visual element of this film is incredibly well-suited to the tastes of cinemagoers today [...] Using IMAX for Flying Tigers would create a new experience for the audience, and I think it would be another breakthrough for Chinese movies".

In October 2021, it was announced that Woo will return to Hollywood to direct the action thriller Silent Night, where a normal father heads into the underworld to avenge his young son’s death.  Produced by Basil Iwanyk, the film will star Joel Kinnaman and will be told entirely without dialogue.

Personal life
Woo has been married to Annie Woo Ngau Chun-lung since 1976. They have two daughters,  Kimberley Woo, Angeles Woo, and a son Frank Woo. He is a Christian and told BBC in an interview that he believes in God and has utmost admiration for Jesus, whom he calls a "great philosopher".

He cites his three favorite films as David Lean's Lawrence of Arabia, Akira Kurosawa's Seven Samurai and Jean-Pierre Melville's Le Samouraï.

Filmography

Film

Producer only

Television

Other works
Airport '98 (Nike commercial) (1998)
Hostage (branded content short film for BMW) (2002)
7 Brothers (graphic novel) (2006–2007)
Stranglehold (video game) (2007)
Bloodstroke (iOS and Android videogame) (2014)
 (Asahi Breweries commercial) (2013)
The Men of Atalissa (New York Times short documentary) (2014)

Accolades
2022 — Career Achievement Award at 26th Fantasia International Film Festival.

See also
Cinema of China
Cinema of Hong Kong

References

Further reading

In English
 Bliss, Michael. Between the Bullets: The Spiritual Cinema of John Woo. Filmmakers series, no. 92. Lanham, Md.: Scarecrow Press, 2002. .
 Brown, Andrew M. J. Directing Hong Kong: The Political Cinema of John Woo and Wong Kar-Wai. Political Communications in Greater China: the Construction and Reflection of Identity. London: RoutledgeCurzon, 2001. .
 Crawford, Kevin R. "Mixing violence and religion in 'The Reckoning' : The Scripting of a Postmodern Action Thriller inside the John Woo-film noir Paradigm". Digital Dissertation/Theses, 2007. .
 Fang, Karen Y. John Woo's A Better Tomorrow. The New Hong Kong Cinema. Hong Kong: Hong Kong University Press, 2004. .
 Hall, Kenneth E. John Woo: The Films. Jefferson, N.C.: McFarland, 1999. .
 Heard, Christopher. Ten Thousand Bullets: The Cinematic Journey of John Woo. Los Angeles: Lone Eagle Publishing Co., 2000. .

Other languages
 Berruezo, Pedro J. John Woo y el cine de acción de Hong Kong. Biblioteca Dr. Vértigo, 23. [Barcelona]: Ediciones Glénat, 2000. . 
 Bertolino, Marco, and Ettore Ridola. John Woo: la violenza come redenzione. Recco, Genova: Le mani, 1998. . 
 Gaschler, Thomas, and Ralph Umard. Woo Leben und Werk. München: Belleville, 2005. . 
 Nazzaro, Giona A., and Andrea Tagliacozzo. John Woo: la nuova leggenda del cinema d'azione. Contatti, 199. Roma: Castelvecchi, 2000. . 
 Spanu, Massimiliano. John Woo. Il castoro cinema, 203. Milano: Castoro, 2001. . 
 Vié-Toussaint, Caroline. John Woo. Paris: Dark star, 2001. .

External links

A John Woo Retrospective
Ten HARD BOILED Moments – The Best of John Woo 
Allegory and symbolism in John Woo's cinematic arts : themes and aesthetics

 Interview by Aynne Kokas  Asia Pacific Arts, 19 November 2009

1946 births
Living people
Action film directors
Hong Kong film producers
Hong Kong screenwriters
Hong Kong expatriates in the United States
Hong Kong people with disabilities
Hong Kong Protestants
Hong Kong film directors
Artists from Guangzhou
Writers from Guangzhou
Chinese Civil War refugees
Recipients of the Silver Bauhinia Star
Screenwriters from Guangdong
Film directors from Guangdong